Steffen Martus (born Karlsruhe, 1968) is a German literary scholar and Professor of Modern German Literature at Humboldt University in Berlin.

Life 
Between 1989 and 1994 Steffen Martus studied German Philology (language, linguistics and literature), Social studies, Philosophy and Sociology at Ratisbon. In 1998 he obtained his doctorate from the Humboldt University in Berlin, where he stayed for  post-doctoral studies. At the DFG Graduate school he worked on a "Codification of violence in the changing media" ("Codierung von Gewalt im medialen Wandel"), and was an academic researcher at the Institute for German Literature ("Institut für deutsche Literatur"). In 2006 he was invited to accept a professorship for Modern German literature at the University of Erlangen-Nuremberg. In 2007 he succeeded  as professor for Modern German literature at the University of Kiel.

Since 2010 he has occupied a newly created professorship for Modern German literature (eighteenth century to contemporary) at the Humboldt University in Berlin.

The focus of his academic scope embraces German literature from the seventeenth century till the present, the interactions between literature and science, questions of literary theory along with the praxeology of spiritual and cultural awarenesses.

Since 1997 Martus has been writing as a literary critic for Die Zeit, the Süddeutsche Zeitung and the Berliner Zeitung.

His biography of the Brothers Grimm appeared in 2009 and was nominated for the 2010 Leipzig Book Fair Prize in the "Non-fiction/essay" category.   Steffen Martus is a co-producer of Humboldt University's , a member of the editorial team on Text+Kritik and an (advisor-)member of the Humanities Network for German Literature and Philology.

Recognition 
 Humboldt Prize from Humboldt-University, Berlin 1999 for his doctoral thesis.

Publications

Monographs 
 Die Brüder Grimm. Eine Biographie. Berlin 2009. 2. und 3. Auflage 2010. 
 Werkpolitik. Zur Literaturgeschichte kritischer Kommunikation vom 17. bis ins 20. Jahrhundert mit Studien zu Klopstock, Tieck, Goethe und George. de Gruyter, Berlin 2007, 
 Ernst Jünger, Metzler, Stuttgart 2001 
 Friedrich von Hagedorn – Konstellationen der Aufklärung, de Gruyter, Berlin 1999

Co-productions/ as editor 
 Killy Literatur Lexikon. (Hrsg., mit WIlhelm Kühlmann u.A.) Autoren und Werke des deutschsprachigen Kulturraums (13 Vols., published by Walter de Gruyter, Berlin / New York 2008-11)
 Das Buch der Bücher – gelesen, (produced with Andrea Polaschegg), Lang, Bern 2006 
 Die Kunst der Aufrichtigkeit im 17. Jahrhundert (produced with Claudia Benthien), Niemeyer, Tübingen 2006 
 Lyrik im 19. Jahrhundert, (Hrsg. mit Stefan Scherer und Claudia Stockinger), Lang, Bern 2005 
 Schlachtfelder. Zur Codierung von Gewalt im medialen Wandel (produced with Marina Münkler und Werner Röcke), Akademien Berlin 2003

References

External links 
  
 Homepage an der HU Berlin
 Humboldt-Preis 1998 der HU Berlin

1968 births
Writers from Karlsruhe
German literary critics
20th-century German non-fiction writers
Academic staff of the Humboldt University of Berlin
German literary theorists
Living people
20th-century German male writers
German male non-fiction writers